Hooghoudt may refer to:
 Hooghoudt distillery, in the Netherlands
 6072 Hooghoudt, an asteroid
 Drainage equation of S.B. Hooghoudt